Gian Giacomo Bruni (died 1507) was a Roman Catholic prelate who served as Bishop of Nepi e Sutri (1506–1507).

Biography
On 6 February 1506, Gian Giacomo Bruni was appointed during the papacy of Pope Julius II as Bishop of Nepi e Sutri.
He served as Bishop of Nepi e Sutri' until his death in 1507.

References

External links and additional sources
 (for Chronology of Bishops) 
 (for Chronology of Bishops) 

16th-century Italian Roman Catholic bishops
Bishops appointed by Pope Julius II
1507 deaths